Olukemi Olufunto "Kemi" Badenoch (née Adegoke, 2 January 1980) is a British politician serving as Secretary of State for Business and Trade since 2023 and President of the Board of Trade and Minister for Women and Equalities since 2022. She previously held a series of junior ministerial positions under Boris Johnson from 2019 to 2022. A member of the Conservative Party, in 2017 she was elected as Member of Parliament (MP) for Saffron Walden in Essex, having previously been a Conservative Member of the London Assembly.

In 2012, Badenoch unsuccessfully contested a seat on the London Assembly, but was appointed to the body after Victoria Borwick resigned in 2015. A supporter of Brexit in the 2016 referendum, Badenoch was elected to the House of Commons in 2017. After Boris Johnson became Prime Minister in July 2019, Badenoch was appointed Parliamentary Under-Secretary of State for Children and Families. In the February 2020 reshuffle, she was appointed Exchequer Secretary to the Treasury and Parliamentary Under-Secretary of State for Equalities. In September 2021, she was promoted to Minister of State for Equalities and appointed Minister of State for Local Government, Faith and Communities. In July 2022, Badenoch resigned from the government and unsuccessfully stood to replace Johnson in the July–September 2022 Conservative Party leadership election. Following Liz Truss's appointment as Prime Minister in September 2022, she appointed Badenoch as Secretary of State for International Trade and President of the Board of Trade; she was reappointed by Truss's successor, Rishi Sunak, the following month.

In a February 2023 cabinet reshuffle, Badenoch was moved into the role of Secretary of State for Business and Trade following the merging of Department for International Trade with elements of the Department for Business, Energy and Industrial Strategy. Badenoch retained the responsibilities of equalities minister.

Early life

Olukemi Olufunto Adegoke was born on 2 January 1980 in Wimbledon, London. She is one of three children born to middle class Yoruba parents. Her father, Femi Adegoke, is a GP and her mother, Feyi Adegoke, is a professor of physiology. Badenoch spent parts of her childhood living in Lagos, Nigeria and in the United States, where her mother lectured. She has a brother named Fola and a sister called Lola.  She returned to the UK at the age of 16 to live with a friend of her mother's owing to the deteriorating political and economic situation in Nigeria which had affected her family. Although a British citizen and born in the UK, Badenoch stated that she was "to all intents and purposes a first-generation immigrant" during her parliamentary maiden speech.

Education and private sector career 
She obtained A Levels from Phoenix College, a former further education college in Morden, whilst working at a branch of McDonald's among other jobs. Badenoch studied Computer Systems Engineering at the University of Sussex, completing a Master of Engineering (MEng) degree in 2003. She initially worked within the IT sector, first as a software engineer at Logica (later CGI Group) from 2003 to 2006.

While working there she studied law part-time at Birkbeck, University of London, and completed a Bachelor of Laws (LLB) degree in 2009. Badenoch then worked as a systems analyst at the Royal Bank of Scotland Group, before pursuing a career in consultancy and financial services, working as an associate director of private bank and wealth manager Coutts from 2006 to 2013 and later a digital director at The Spectator from 2015 to 2016.

Early political career

Badenoch joined the Conservative Party in 2005 at the age of 25. At the 2010 general election, she contested the Dulwich and West Norwood constituency against Labour's Tessa Jowell and came third.

London Assembly 
In 2012, Badenoch stood for the Conservatives in the London Assembly election, where she was placed fifth on the London-wide list. The election saw the Conservatives win only three seats from the London-wide list, so Badenoch was not elected.

Three years later, in the 2015 general election, Victoria Borwick was elected to the House of Commons and subsequently resigned her seat on the London Assembly. The fourth-placed candidate on the list, Suella Fernandes, had also been elected to the House of Commons, and declined to fill the vacancy. Badenoch (as she had become, following her marriage in 2012) was therefore declared to be the new Assembly Member. She went on to retain her seat in the Assembly in the 2016 election. Badenoch supported Brexit in the 2016 UK EU membership referendum.

Parliamentary career 
Badenoch was shortlisted to be the Conservative Party candidate for the marginal Hampstead and Kilburn constituency at the 2017 general election, but was unsuccessful. She was ultimately selected as the Conservative candidate for Saffron Walden, a safe seat for her party, which she held with 37,629 votes and a majority of 24,966 (41.0%).

Early tenure 
In her maiden speech as an MP on 19 July, she described the vote for Brexit as "the greatest ever vote of confidence in the project of the United Kingdom" and cited her personal heroes as the Conservative politicians Winston Churchill, Airey Neave and Margaret Thatcher.

In the same month, Badenoch was selected to join the 1922 Executive Committee. In September, she was appointed to the parliamentary Justice Select Committee. She was appointed as the Conservative Party's Vice Chair for Candidates in January 2018.

She voted for Prime Minister Theresa May's Brexit withdrawal agreement in early 2019. In the indicative votes on 27 March, she voted against a referendum on a withdrawal agreement and against a customs union with the EU. In October, Badenoch voted for Johnson's withdrawal agreement.

In the run-up to the 2019 Conservative Party leadership election, Badenoch was tipped as a possible contender just two years into her tenure in parliament. Badenoch instead supported the campaign of Michael Gove. In the December 2019 general election, she was re-elected with an increased majority of 27,594 (43.7%) votes.

Johnson government 
In July 2019, Badenoch was appointed as Parliamentary Under Secretary of State for Children and Families by the Prime Minister, Boris Johnson. In February 2020, Badenoch was appointed Exchequer Secretary to the Treasury and Parliamentary Under Secretary of State (Minister for Equalities) in the Department for International Trade. She has been a member of the Public Accounts Committee since March 2020.

In a government reshuffle in September 2021, Badenoch was promoted to Minister of State for Equalities and appointed Minister of State for Housing, Communities and Local Government. Within days of her appointments, the latter title was renamed "Minister of State for Levelling Up Communities". On 6 July 2022, Badenoch resigned from government, citing Johnson's handling of the Chris Pincher scandal, in a joint statement with fellow Ministers Alex Burghart, Neil O'Brien, Lee Rowley and Julia Lopez.

Leadership candidacy 

Following Johnson's resignation, Badenoch launched a bid to succeed him as Conservative Party leader, stating that she wanted to "tell the truth" and that she advocated "strong but limited government". As a candidate, she called the target of net zero carbon emissions "ill-thought through" and said that politicians had become "hooked on the idea of the state fixing the majority of problems". She launched her campaign at an event held on 12 July. At her launch, handwritten signs saying "Men" and "Ladies" were taped to the doors of gender-neutral toilets.

According to The Sunday Times, Badenoch entered the race as "a relatively unknown minister for local government" but "within a week emerged as the insurgent candidate to become Britain’s next prime minister". She was eliminated in the fourth round of voting, as she received the fewest votes of the remaining candidates. The following table shows how many MPs supported Badenoch in each election round:

Following her elimination from the leadership contest, Badenoch did not endorse another candidate.

Truss government 
In September 2022. after Liz Truss became Prime Minister, she appointed Badenoch to her cabinet as Secretary of State for International Trade. Following Truss' resignation the following month, Badenoch endorsed Rishi Sunak in the leadership election, stating that he was "the serious, honest leader we need".

Sunak government 
On 25 October 2022, Badenoch was retained as International Trade Secretary by Rishi Sunak upon his ascension to the Prime Ministership. She was also granted the additional role of Minister for Women & Equalities.

In a February 2023 cabinet reshuffle, Badenoch  was appointed as the first Secretary of State at the newly-created Department for Business and Trade, with continued responsibility for equalities. The new role was effectively an expansion of her portfolio as International Trade Secretary to include the business and investment responsibilities of the now-defunct Department for Business, Energy and Industrial Strategy.

In January 2023, Badenoch, as equalities minister, appointed Joanne Cash as a commissioner to the Equality and Human Rights Commission (EHRC) board. Badenoch said that Cash had "a track record of promoting women's rights and freedom of expression". The Labour Party criticised the appointment as, after being approved for the appointment, Cash had donated money to Badenoch's campaign as a candidate for leadership of the Conservative Party in the summer of 2022 and Badenoch had not declared this. The Guardian said that Badenoch had not broken any rules by making the appointment. The EHRC said it has "robust procedures in place to manage conflicts of interest or perceived conflicts of interest, including requiring any board members to recuse themselves from discussion where there may be conflicts. These procedures will be applied in this case too". A government’s Equality Hub spokesperson said the appointment "was made following a full and open competition, which involved a public application process and interviews with an expert panel".

Political views

Beliefs 
Many regard Badenoch as being on the right wing of the Conservative Party. She has personally described herself as being on the "liberal wing" of the Conservative Party  who is "not really left-leaning on anything". She has identified philosopher Roger Scruton and economist Thomas Sowell as her influences, citing Sowell’s Basic Economics as an influence. She has also been characterized as a social conservative and 'anti-woke' politician.

Race relations 

 
During a debate in the House of Commons in April 2021, Badenoch criticised the Labour Party's response to a report compiled by the Commission on Race and Ethnic Disparities that had declared Britain was not institutionally racist. Labour had described the report as "cherry-picking of data", while the party's former frontbench MP Dawn Butler claimed the report was "gaslighting on a national scale", describing those who put it together as "racial gatekeepers." Badenoch accused Labour of "wilful misrepresentations" over the report and responded to Butler's comments by stating "It is wrong to accuse those who argue for a different approach as being racism deniers or race traitors. It's even more irresponsible, dangerously so, to call ethnic minority people racial slurs like Uncle Toms, coconuts, house slaves or house negroes for daring to think differently."

In a Black History Month debate in the House of Commons in October 2020, she reiterated the government's opposition to primary and secondary schools teaching white privilege and similar "elements of critical race theory" as uncontested facts. ConservativeHome readers voted Badenoch's speech on critical race theory 2020 'speech of the year', in which she said that any school that teaches "elements of political race theory as fact, or which promotes partisan political views such as defunding the police without offering a balanced treatment of opposing views, is breaking the law".

During her leadership campaign launch, Badenoch expressed criticism of identity politics in a 2022 article for The Times, arguing that "identity politics is not about tolerance or individual rights, but the very opposite of our crucial and enduring British values."

Colonialism 
Regarding the United Kingdom's colonial history, Badenoch has argued that "There were terrible things that happened during the British Empire, there were other good things that happened, and we need to tell both sides of the story".

In leaked WhatsApp messages, Badenoch said "I don't care about colonialism because [I] know what we were doing before colonialism got there" and argued that Europeans "came in and just made a different bunch of winners and losers" on the African continent. She also stated that prior to colonization, "There was never any concept of 'rights,' so [the] people who lost out were old elites not everyday people". In an interview with Sky News, Badenoch became the first government minister to speak Yoruba and explained that while she believed colonialism had an impact, many of the problems facing Nigeria were not down to colonialism but governance.

LGBTQ+ rights 
In 2019, Badenoch abstained on a vote to extend same-sex marriage rights to Northern Ireland. In March 2021, Badenoch was encouraged to "consider her position" as an equalities minister by Jayne Ozanne, one of a group of three government LGBT advisers who quit their roles due to the decision by the government not to include transgender conversion therapy in its plans to ban gay conversion therapy, with Ozanne describing a speech by Badenoch on the issue as being "appalling" and the "final straw".

As Minister of State for Equalities, Badenoch opposed plans by the Financial Conduct Authority to allow trans employees to self-identify in the workplace, and opposed gender-neutral toilets in public buildings.

In 2021, Vice News said they had received leaked audio from 2018 in which Badenoch mocked gay marriage, referred to trans women as "men" and used the term transsexual which is considered offensive by some trans people.

Comment on millennials 
In 2018, Badenoch commented on sexual morality attitudes among millennials:When I look at a lot of the stuff that you see on social media about how – I think it's a generational thing as well – younger people look at appropriate behaviours and what is a sexual advance, what is sexual harassment and so on; to me, it's actually becoming a lot more puritanical than anything I ever saw in my 20s or in my teens.

Controversies

Hacking of Labour MP's website 
In 2018, Badenoch admitted that, a decade earlier, she had hacked into the website of Harriet Harman, who was then Deputy Leader of the Labour Party; Harman accepted Badenoch's apology, but the matter was reported to Action Fraud, the UK's cyber crime reporting centre.

Tulip Siddiq comments 
In 2019, Badenoch was criticised by a number of Labour MPs for suggesting that Tulip Siddiq was "making a point" by delaying her scheduled Caesarean section in order to attend a House of Commons vote on Brexit.

Journalist Nadine White incident 
Badenoch published a series of tweets in January 2021 in which she included screenshots of questions sent to her office by HuffPost journalist Nadine White whom she, as a result, accused of "creepy and bizarre behaviour". White subsequently made her Twitter account private, citing the abuse she received. Badenoch's actions were criticised by both the National Union of Journalists and the Council of Europe's Safety of Journalists Platform. She was defended by the prime minister's press secretary who commented that it was all a "misunderstanding".

Personal life
She is married to Hamish Badenoch; they have two daughters and a son. Hamish works for Deutsche Bank and was a Conservative councillor from 2014 to 2018 on Merton Borough Council, representing Wimbledon Village. He also unsuccessfully contested Foyle for the Northern Ireland Conservatives at the 2015 general election. Badenoch was a board member of the Charlton Triangle Homes housing association until 2016, and was also a school governor at St Thomas the Apostle College in Southwark, and the Jubilee Primary School.

Badenoch describes herself as a cultural Christian and notes that her maternal grandfather was a Methodist minister in Nigeria. Badenoch's father Femi died in February 2022 and she took bereavement leave from her ministerial duties for a brief period.

Honours
She was sworn in as a member of His Majesty’s Most Honourable Privy Council on 13 September 2022 at Buckingham Palace.This gave her the honorific prefix "The Right Honourable"

Notes

References

External links

|-

|-

|-

1980 births
Living people
People from Wimbledon, London
Female members of the Parliament of the United Kingdom for English constituencies
Black British women politicians
21st-century English women politicians
Alumni of the University of Sussex
Alumni of Birkbeck, University of London
English people of Yoruba descent
British women engineers
English expatriates in the United States
The Spectator people
McDonald's people
21st-century women engineers
Conservative Members of the London Assembly
Conservative Party (UK) MPs for English constituencies
UK MPs 2017–2019
UK MPs 2019–present
Black British MPs
Women councillors in England
British Eurosceptics
Ministers for Women and Equalities
Presidents of the Board of Trade
Female members of the Cabinet of the United Kingdom
Members of the Privy Council of the United Kingdom